Haluk Levent (born Haluk Acil; 26 November 1968) is a Turkish rock music singer who helped revive the long forgotten Anatolian rock genre in the 1990s.

After graduating from high school, he joined various university programs but he had to quit for economic reasons.

Levent moved to Istanbul in 1992. He worked at various bars in Ortaköy until he met with Yildiray Gürgen. He also worked with musicians like Serdar Öztop and Akın Eldes to increase the quality of his albums. In July 1993 he released his first album, Yollarda. Following his first album, his second album Bir Gece Vakti had sales approaching one million dollars in 1995. In September 1998, he released the album Yine Ayrılık. Following his military service, he released Kral Çıplak in February 2001, Bir Erkeğin Günlüğü in October 2002, Aç Pencereni in September 2004, and Annemin Türküleri in 2005.

Ahbap 
In 2017 he founded the NGO Ahbap which by 2023 was active in 68 cities of Turkey. Following the earthquake on February 2023, his NGO Ahbap assisted the affected which made him very popular among the Turkish society. Campaigns to donate to his NGO instead of to the Disaster and Emergency Management Presidency (AFAD) of the Turkish Government were organized, as parts of the society did not trust the AFAD to do their work.  This then led to pro-Government outlets criticizing Ahbap and Haluk Levent. But after  Levent demanded support for both his NGO and AFAD and the famous singer Tarkan came to his support, public opinion changed and "AFAD is ours, as is Ahbap" became the leading hashtag in Turkey.

Discography
Studio albums
 Yollarda / Bu Ateş Sönmez (Prestij Müzik) (1993)
 Bir Gece Vakti (Prestij Müzik) (1995)
 Arkadaş (Prestij Müzik) (1996) 
 Mektup (Prestij Müzik) (1997) 
 Yine Ayrılık''' (Prestij Müzik) (1998) 
 www.leyla.com (2000) 
 Kral Çıplak (2001)
 Bir Erkeğin Günlüğü (Popüler Müzik) (2002) 
 Özel Canlı İstanbul Konseri (Popüler Müzik) (2003) 
 Türkiye Turnesi 2003 (Popüler Müzik) (2003) 
 Aç Pencereni (Belis-Seyhan Müzik) (2004) 
 Annemin Türküleri (DMC) (2005) 
 Akşam Üstü (Mod Müzik-Ozan Video) (2006) 
 Karagöz ve Hacivat (Mod Müzik) (2010)
 Trilogy (Süper Müzik Yapım) (2010)
 Dostane (DNK Müzik) (2014)
 Best of Konserler (Süper Müzik Yapım) (2015)
 Tam Bana Göre (Pasaj Müzik & Garaj Müzik) (2019)
 Vasiyet (Pasaj Müzik) (2021)

Compilation albums
 Yaz Şarkıları (2006)
 Pop 2006'' (2006)

References

Turkish rock singers
1968 births
Living people
Anatolian rock musicians
People from Adana